Dorcadion bithyniense is a species of beetle in the family Cerambycidae. It was described by Chevrolat in 1856. It is known from Turkey.

References

bithyniense
Beetles described in 1856